Hands is the plural of hand, a body part.  

Hands may also refer to:

People
 Hands (surname)

Film and television
 The Hands, a 2006 Argentinean-Italian film
 Hands, a 1978–89 Irish craft TV series
 Hands (advertisement), a controversial political advertisement aired on television during the 1990 United States Senate election in North Carolina

Music
 Hands (indie rock band), an American indie rock band
 Hands (metal band), an American Christian metal band
 Hands (Bumblefoot album), an album by Ron "Bumblefoot" Thal
 Hands (Dave Holland and Pepe Habichuela album), an album by Dave Holland and Pepe Habichuela
 Hands (Little Boots album)
 Hands (EP), an extended play by Emanuel and the Fear
 "Hands" (2016 song), a charity song by various artists to raise money for victims of the 2016 Orlando nightclub shooting
 "Hands" (Jewel song), a song by Jewel Kilcher
 "Hands" (Mike Perry song)
 "Hands" (Kumi Koda song)
 "Hands" (The Raconteurs song)
 "Hands" (The Ting Tings song)
 "Hands", a song from Rounds by Four Tet
 "Hands", a song from Planet Shining by m-flo
 "Hands", a song by Spratleys Japs

See also
 Hand (disambiguation)
 Mr. Hands (disambiguation)